Pentakomo (or ) is a village in the Limassol District of Cyprus, located 5 km east of Pyrgos.

References

 
Communities in Limassol District